Philippe Saive is a male former international table tennis player from Belgium.

Table tennis career
He won a silver medal at the 2001 World Table Tennis Championships in the Swaythling Cup (men's team event) with Martin Bratanov, Marc Closset, Andras Podpinka, and Jean-Michel Saive (his brother) for Belgium.

He competed in three Olympic Games in 1992, 1996, and 2000.

Personal life
He is the younger brother of retired professional table tennis player Jean-Michel Saive.

See also
 List of table tennis players
 List of World Table Tennis Championships medalists

References

1971 births
Living people
Belgian male table tennis players
Olympic table tennis players of Belgium
Table tennis players at the 1992 Summer Olympics
Table tennis players at the 1996 Summer Olympics
Table tennis players at the 2000 Summer Olympics
Sportspeople from Liège
World Table Tennis Championships medalists